Firangi is a Hindi-language entertainment channel, that was owned by Sahara India Pariwar. Earlier, this channel had telecasted some international shows and movies that were dubbed under Hindi language.

Former shows

Dubbed series 
Second Chance
Lalola
Dolmen
Love Is In The Air

Acquired series 
Malini Iyer
Comedy Champions
Shubh Mangal Savdhaan
Hi! Padosi... Kaun Hai Doshi?
Hit Music
Dhoom
MBKAKM

References

Hindi-language television channels in India
Television channels and stations established in 2008
Hindi-language television stations
Television stations in New Delhi
2008 establishments in Delhi